Per Pettersen (born 6 July 1946) was a Norwegian football defender and later manager.

He played for Frigg between 1964 and 1973, finishing 4th in the league on three occasions, and being a runner-up in the 1965 Norwegian Football Cup. He represented Norway as a U19, U21 and senior international. In 1973 he was awarded the Player of the Year title by VG.

He managed Frigg, Norway women and Stabæk.

References

1946 births
Living people
Footballers from Oslo
Norwegian footballers
Frigg Oslo FK players
Norway youth international footballers
Norway under-21 international footballers
Norway international footballers
Association football defenders
Norwegian football managers
Norway women's national football team managers
Stabæk Fotball managers